"Tongue Song" is a song by American rapper Strings. Released as a single in July 2000, the song was supposed to be the lead single from Strings's debut album, "The Black Widow", but the album has never been released only the Listening Post Edition (Promo CD) and Sampler Copies were pressed. The single performed moderately on the east coast radio stations, peaking at twenty-four on Billboard's Bubbling Under R&B/Hip-Hop Songs and thirteen on the Hot Rap Songs as well.

Commercial performance
The song "Tongue Song" by Strings has been listed for 14 weeks on the Billboard's Hot Rap Songs chart, a week on the Bubbling Under R&B/Hip-Hop Songs chat and 8 weeks on the Hot R&B/Hip-Hop Singles Sales chart.

Track listings and formats

Charts

References

2000 songs
2000 singles
Songs written by Desmond Child
Songs written by Draco Rosa
Songs written by Bob Robinson (songwriter)
Songs written by Sisqó
East Coast hip hop songs
American hip hop songs
Epic Records singles